The moth skink (Ornithuroscincus noctua) is a species of skink. It is found in Pacific regions including Sulawesi, Northern Papua New Guinea, Solomon Islands, Vanuatu, Tuamotu, Marquesas Islands, Pitcairn Islands, Hawaii, Indonesia, Fiji, Western Samoa, Admiralty Islands, Bismarck Archipelago, Tonga, Toga, Tegua, Cook Islands and Guam.

References

Ornithuroscincus
Reptiles described in 1830
Taxa named by René Lesson
Reptiles of Hawaii